The Arkansas Travelers, also known informally as The Travs, are a Minor League Baseball team based in North Little Rock, Arkansas. The Travelers are affiliated with the Seattle Mariners as members of the Texas League.

History
The team succeeded the Double-A Little Rock Travelers of the Southern Association, which folded after the 1961 season. They returned as the Arkansas Travelers of the International League in 1963. Both versions of the name derive from the old folk song, "The Arkansas Traveler". The Travelers never took another nickname and possess the third-longest running nickname in minor league baseball history behind the Buffalo Bisons and Indianapolis Indians.

Affiliations 
After the end of the Southern Association in 1961, the Travelers were given the opportunity to move up becoming the Philadelphia Phillies' Triple-A affiliate for first the International League (1963) and then the Pacific Coast League (1964–1965). However, in 1966 the Travelers moved down to the Texas League as the St. Louis Cardinals' Double-A affiliate through 2000. This marked the most successful period for the Travelers as they won the Texas League championship in 1971, 1977, 1979, 1980, and 1989. After serving 35 years as a Cardinals' affiliate, the Travelers became the Los Angeles Angels' Double-A affiliate in 2001; this ended the second-longest active affiliation at the time. The Travelers remained with the Angels through 2016, winning the Texas League championship in 2001 and 2008. In 2017, the Travelers entered into a new Player Development Contract, becoming the Double-A affiliate of the Seattle Mariners; this move marked just the second time in the last half century that the Travelers swapped major league teams. The 2018 season marked the Arkansas Travelers' 53rd season as a part of the Texas League, making them the longest tenured active member of the league.

In conjunction with Major League Baseball's restructuring of Minor League Baseball in 2021, the Travelers were organized into the Double-A Central. In 2022, the Double-A Central became known as the Texas League, the name historically used by the regional circuit prior to the 2021 reorganization.

Ballparks

Ray Winder Field

From 1932 to 2006, the Travelers played at Ray Winder Field. Bill Valentine, a former American League umpire and chosen as general manager for the Travelers from 1976 to 2007, began to promote the historic nature of Ray Winder Field.  The ballpark gained recognition as one of the oldest still active parks in minor league baseball, and fans traveled to Little Rock to experience the nostalgia and sample the baseball history represented by Ray Winder Field. However, after nearly three-quarters of a century, the field was showing signs of age and after a successful special election in 2005, the team moved to a new stadium at the start of the 2007 season and the field was demolished in 2012. In 1991, the field saw the largest crowd to watch a baseball game in Arkansas history as Ray Winder played host to about 12,000 people; the crowd had come from all over to see Fernando Valenzuela's rehabilitation start.

Dickey–Stephens Park

Dickey–Stephens Park, the new stadium in North Little Rock, Arkansas, hosted the first Travelers game against the Frisco RoughRiders on April 12, 2007. It is primarily used for baseball and is the home field of the Arkansas Travelers minor league baseball team. It holds at least 7,000 people. It was built through a partnership between the Travs, Little Rock financier Warren Stephens and the city of North Little Rock. After donating an  plot of land east of the Broadway Bridge, Mr. Stephens named the ballpark in honor of two pairs of baseball-loving brothers; Stephens Inc. Founders Jack and Witt Stephens, and Hall of Fame Catcher Bill Dickey and his brother Skeeter, also a former Major League ballplayer. Both Dickey brothers worked for Stephens Inc. following their baseball careers. Bill, who caught for the 1925 Little Rock Travelers, also managed the club for one season following a 17-year Hall-of-Fame career with the New York Yankees that included seven World Series titles.

Uniforms
In 2004, the team introduced new road jerseys and alternate caps that paid homage to the Travs' home city. The jerseys had "Little Rock" written across the chest. Travelers’ jerseys have either featured "Arkansas" or "Travelers" ever since the 1950s.

Roster

General managers

Ray Winder
In Ray Winder, was the general manager for Little Rock Travelers when it became defunct in 1961, but continued as general manager for the Arkansas Travelers until 1976. Winder had worked as a ticket taker in 1915 before rising to general manager. More than once, he almost single-handedly kept baseball in Little Rock. In 1960, at the last minute, he used his relationships with major league teams to sign enough players for the Travelers to field a team—it had looked as if the team would not make or would have to move to another town. During his 50-plus years with the team, he saw the Travelers sink to the bottom of the league only to rise three times to the league championship.

Bill Valentine

In 1976, Bill Valentine, a former American League umpire, was chosen as general manager for the Travelers. Valentine would remain general manager until in 2007 after 31 years and would remain executive vice president for two more seasons, before retiring in March 2009. Valentine worked as an announcer for the Arkansas Travelers for eight years.  In his first season as general manager, the team saw a 34% increase in attendance, due in part to Valentine's stunts including giving away tens of thousands of tickets to kids, hoping they would bring their parents to the game with them, and holding midget wrestling and amateur boxing at the stadium. The Travelers' attendance continued to increase over the years, and also saw on-field success, winning five league titles while Valentine was GM. Valentine has been inducted into the Arkansas Sports Hall of Fame, the Arkansas Officials Association Hall of Fame, the Texas League Hall of Fame, and the North Little Rock Boys Club Hall of Fame.

References

External links
 Official website

Texas League teams
Defunct International League teams
Defunct Pacific Coast League teams
Anaheim Angels minor league affiliates
Los Angeles Angels minor league affiliates
Los Angeles Angels of Anaheim minor league affiliates
Philadelphia Phillies minor league affiliates
Professional baseball teams in Arkansas
Baseball teams established in 1963
Sports in Little Rock, Arkansas
St. Louis Cardinals minor league affiliates
Seattle Mariners minor league affiliates
Double-A Central teams